Linda Chaikin (born 1943) is a Christian fiction author with a focus on historical fiction.  She sometimes publishes using the name L. L. Chaikin.

Chaikin was the youngest of 10 children and her father died shortly after she was born.  She wrote her first full-length novel with pen and paper at the age of 14 - this novel was later rewritten as Wednesday's Child, part of the Day to Remember series.

She met her husband, Steve, in a Bible study, and they were married 6 months later.  They both went to Multnomah School of the Bible, now known as Multnomah Bible College and Biblical Seminary in Portland, Oregon.

Books by Linda Chaikin

Heart of India series 

Published by Bethany House.

 Silk, 1993
 Under Eastern Stars, 1993
 Kingscote, 1994

Royal Pavilions series 

Published by Thomas Nelson.

 Swords and Scimitars, 1993
 Golden Palaces, 1996
 Behind the Veil, 1998

Great Northwest series 

Published by Bethany House.

 Empire Builders, 1994
 Winds of Allegiance, 1996

Buccaneers series 

Published by Moody Publishers.

 Port Royal, 1995
 The Pirate and His Lady, 1997
 Jamaican Sunset, 1997

Egypt series 

Published by Multnomah Publishers.

 Arabian Winds, 1997
 Lions of the Desert, 1997
 Valiant Hearts, 1998

Trade Winds series 

Published by Harvest House.

 Captive Heart, 1998
 Silver Dreams, 1998
 Island Bride, 1999

Day to Remember series 

Published by Harvest House.

 Monday's Child, 1999
 Tuesday's Child, 2000
 Wednesday's Child, 2000
 Thursday's Child, 2001
 Friday's Child, 2001
 Saturday's Child, 2003

East of the Sun series 

Published by WaterBrook press, a division of Random House.

 Tomorrow's Treasure, 2003
 Yesterday's Promise, 2004
 Today's Embrace, 2005

Desert Rose/Desert Star 

Published by Harvest House.

 Desert Rose, 2003
 Desert Star, 2004

Silk House series 

Published by Zondervan.

 Daughter of Silk, 2006
 Written On Silk, 2007
 Threads of Silk, 2008

Dawn of Hawaii series 

Published by Moody Publishers.

 The Spoils of Eden, 2010
 Hawaiian Crosswinds, 2011
 Jewel of the Pacific, 2013

Standalone books 

 Recovery of the Lost Sword, 1990.  Same story as The Everlasting Flame.
 Nevada Jade, 1992.  This story was later expanded in Desert Rose.
 The Everlasting Flame: A Tale of Undying Love for Each Other And God's World in a Dangerous Time, 1995
 Endangered, 1997 - part of the Portraits series.
 For Whom the Stars Shine, 1999.  Listed as book one, but later used as a prequel to the Dawn of Hawaii series.
 The Midwife of St. Petersburg, 2007.  Published by WaterBrook Press, a division of Random House.

References

External links
 lindachaikinbooks.com, personal site
 Fantastic fiction: Linda Chaikin

1943 births
Living people
American historical novelists
Christian novelists
Multnomah University alumni
American women novelists
Women historical novelists
21st-century American women